The Ordos (Mongolian Cyrillic: Ордос) are a Mongol subgroup that live in Uxin Banner, Inner Mongolia of China. Ordos literally means plural of Ordo.

The Three Tribes of Uriyangkhaid, Tümed in north Shanxi, Ordos Mongols in Ordos and north of Shensi extended southward beyond the Ming defense zone in the 14-15th centuries. Since 1510, the Ordos were ruled by descendants of Batumongke Dayan Khan.

The Ordos Mongols believe that they have been responsible for the shrine of Genghis Khan since their inception. However, the modern place where mausoleum of Genghis Khan located is inhabited by the Darkhads because the Ordos Mongols were forced to be resettled outside Ordos grasslands. Traditionally, Ordos territory is divided into 7 banners.

Their number reached 64,000 in 1950 and a possible current estimate of the Ordos people might be less than 100,000.

References

Mongols
Ethnic groups in Mongolia
Mongol peoples
Southern Mongols